Les Rencontres Trans Musicales (generally referred to as Les Transmusicales de Rennes) is a music festival that lasts for 3 or 4 days. It is held annually in December. The festival takes place in Rennes, Brittany, France.
Since the festival's beginning, it has been renowned for revealing the "next big thing" in music.
The festival has become one of the most significant musical events in Europe, attracting over 62,000 people in 2013. It attracted over 80 groups and artists from over 26 nationalities and music industry professionals coming from all continents.

Historical 

Les Rencontres Trans Musicales, often called Les Trans, was created in 1979 by Béatrice Macé, Jean-Louis Brossard, Hervé Bordier (until 1996), Jean-René (until 1989), and other music students. The association was initially in debt, which led to programming a benefit concert. The first concert took place in la salle de la Cité in June. Twelve bands performed on two nights to an audience of approximately 1800 people. The second concert was in December 2013. 
Jean-Louis Brossard is the artistic director and Sandrine Poutrel is the production manager. Jean-Louis Brossard and Béatrice Macé together lead Les Rencontres Trans Musicales. From the first concerts, before the word 'festival' had been attached to the event, the artistic bias of the line up was toward originality and new artistic forms. The artists who participated in the festival would often rise to the top of the music charts within a few months following their performance. Björk, Ben Harper and Lenny Kravitz all performed for the first time in public in the festival. It is considered that the festival boosted the popularity of Étienne Daho, Arno, Stephan Eicher, Les Négresses Vertes, Nirvana, Bérurier Noir, Denez Prigent, Daft Punk, Amadou & Mariam, Birdy Nam Nam, Justice, Fugees, Stromae, London Grammar and many other bands.

In 2004, the festival moved to the Parc Expo, close to Rennes Bretagne Airport. Some concerts are still organized in the town of Rennes.  In 2004, the festival moved to the Parc Expo
Since 1979, TRANS has shown the ability to capture the musical zeitgeist and to maintain with it a combination of discovery and influence.
TRANS exported itself to China, Norway, Czech Republic and Russia. On 8 December 2010, l'Association des Trans Musicales launched a website that recounts the history of the festival.

Line-up
Striking artists:

 1979 : Marquis de Sade
 1980 : Étienne Daho, L’Orchestre Rouge
 1981 : Carte de Séjour, KaS Product, Les Dogs
 1982 : Minimal Compact, Blurt, Marc Minelli
 1983 : Cabaret Voltaire, Litfiba, TC Matic, La Fundación
 1984 : The Full, Stephan Eicher, Chevalier Brothers
 1985 : The Woodentops, Sigue Sigue Sputnik
 1986 : Noir Désir, Mint Juleps, Bérurier Noir
 1987 : Fishbone, Laibach, Yargo
 1988 : Mano Negra, Les Négresses Vertes, The Sugarcubes
 1989 : Lenny Kravitz, Einstürzende Neubauten, House of Love
 1990 : IAM, Stereo MCs, The La's, FFF
 1991 : Zebda, Keziah Jones, MC Solaar, Nirvana
 1992 : Denez Prigent, Sonic Youth, Underground Resistance, Suicide
 1993 : Björk, Ben Harper, Sinclair, Jamiroquai, Carl Cox
 1994 : Portishead, Massive Attack, Beck, The Prodigy, the Offspring
 1995 : DJ Shadow, Garbage, Chemical Brothers, Laurent Garnier
 1996 : Daft Punk, Nada Surf, Carlinhos Brown, Rinôçérôse
 1997 : Cypress Hill, Faudel, Yann Tiersen, Dyonisos, Tortoise
 1998 : Fat Boy Slim, Basement Jaxx, Freestylers, DJ Krush
 1999 : Macy Gray, Saïan Supa Crew, Coldcut, Groove Armada, Tony Allen
 2000 : Bumcello, De La Soul, Goldfrapp, Saul Williams, Amon Tobin
 2001 : Gotan Project, Röyksopp, Zéro7, Carl Hancock Rux, Overhead, Bauchklang
 2002 : Ginger Ale, Radio 4, Stupeflip, 2 Many DJs, An Pierlé
 2003 : Cody Chesnutt, !!!, Ralph Myerz & The Jack Herren Band
 2004 : Beastie Boys, Dizzee Rascal, Primal Scream, Ebony Bones
 2005 : The Fugees, The Undertones, Coldcut, Brian Jonestown Massacre, Philippe Katerine, Clap Your Hands Say Yeah
 2006 : Cassius, Klaxons, Kaiser Chiefs, Razorlight, The Horrors
 2007 : Simian Mobile Disco, Boys Noize, Étienne de Crécy, Yuksek,
 2008 : Minitel Rose, Birdy Nam Nam, The Shoes, Ebony Bones, The Penelopes, Diplo, Crookers
 2009 : The Japanese Popstars, FM Belfast, Fever Ray, The Very Best, Rodriguez, New Politics, Major Lazer
 2010 : Stromae, M.I.A., Janelle Monáe, A-Trak
 2013 : London Grammar, Jungle, Benjamin Clementine
 2014 : Jeanne Added, Shamir

The Trans Musicales made it clear from the first edition, in June 1979, and their philosophy never changed:
 Reflect the reality of musical life
 Showcase emerging artists
 Find and promote artistic originality
 Help fulfill all the necessary conditions for experimentation

The International Trans project 

The international work has been going on since the end of the 1980s.
Turned towards research and exploration of musical movements and where they originate, the programming puts us in touch with artists, labels, editors and agents on all continents. On the other hand, the Trans collaboration with foreign media and professionals is strong and continuous.
Since the 2001 edition, the International Trans project consolidates and extends their work overseas, in partnership with Cultures France, a governmental operator on all international actions.
The project was conceived as a way to extend the collaboration with the artists beyond the time span of a single edition. The line-up included bands that have performed or are about to perform the Trans in Rennes; they are joined by local artists.

Previous actions

Expo 2002 
The Trans Musicales team programmed two evenings at the Cargo, in Neuchâtel, for the Expo.

Trans/Ubu/Bato Fou 
In March 2003 two evenings and two residencies opposing Dj Morpheus vs. El Diabolo (Réunion) and Dj Buddha vs. Tamm Ha Tamm (Réunion).

Norway 2005 
During the festival, By-Larm, one evening in honour of Rennes and one improvised concert at the top of a glacier.

Beijing 
18 and 19 June 2005 at Chaoyang Park. A huge stage, 16 artists in front of 16 000 spectators for the first open air festival in the Chinese capital.

Russia 
In 2010, concerts took place in Moscow and Saint Petersburg. Hip-Hop, jazz and electronic music were the main events.

Trans on Tour 
Co-produced by the association Trans Musicales, Trans on Tour offers for the ninth year in a row, the opportunity for local bands to perform in the venues of the Great West.
Kick-starting the festival, the main aim of this tour is to assist artists in developing their professionalism. The high point of this tour is a performance at the Trans Musicales for each participating band. The aim is to challenge aspiring artists with a stream of events requiring total immersion in a professional framework.
Being on tour means many concert dates, in this case ending with a performance at a festival visited by professionals: this project is a life-size rehearsal for the life of a professional performer.
Trans on Tour, conceived first as a boost to the local artistic scene, offers a wide range of tools to the bands: interviews at the beginning and the end of the tour, working time on the stage of the Ubu (local stage in Rennes), a regular follow-up by a specialised team, a promotional video and a dedicated stand at the festival's Village.
During this tour with its twenty bands - out of which eight are on an accompaniment program – each concert concludes with the performance of an artist recommended by the host venue.

References

External links
Official website

Breton festivals
Music festivals in France
Rennes
Tourist attractions in Brittany
Tourist attractions in Ille-et-Vilaine